Joseph Royle  (1732 – January 26, 1766) was an English-born American newspaper publisher and printer who lived in the British colony of Virginia.  He was a journeyman who apprenticed under Virginia's printer of public record, William Hunter. He became the foreman in the print shop and upon the death of Hunter, Royle took over his position, a prestigious job of producing all the colony's legal documents. He also published the Virginia Gazette newspaper, which had been started by William Parks. Royle tended to publish articles that favored the colonial government over opposing viewpoints.

Royle lived in Colonial Williamsburg in Virginia and became the postmaster of its post office. Royle owned a number of slaves, who did household chores and worked in his print shop. Several ran away, and he published advertisements in his newspaper to get them recaptured. The historian David Hall writes that Royle followed Ben Franklin's model as a typical colonial merchant and businessman.

Early life 

Royle was Scottish, born in 1732 in an unknown location in Great Britain. It is not known when he immigrated to the American colonies. Royle likely lived in the same colonial Williamsburg house as his employer, the Virginia Gazette publisher William Hunter. This property, known as the "Ravenscroft site" and consisting of two half-acre lots, is located at the corner of Nicholson and Botetourt Streets in colonial Williamsburg. This is at the east end of colonial Williamsburg, a block away from Duke of Gloucester Street, where his Williamsburg print shop and post office were located.

Royle inherited the remainder of a 25-year lease on the Ravenscroft property, some nine years, upon the death of Hunter. He bought the property in 1763 and owned it until his death. The Ravenscroft lots, part of Royle's estate, were held in trust for Royle's son, William. William was two years old when Royle died. Royle was the brother-in-law to the prior tenant on the lease, John Holt. Holt, one time mayor of Colonial Williamsburg, had started the 25-year lease in 1745. Royle became Holt's brother-in-law when he married William Hunter's sister, Roseanna. Roseanna was the younger sister of Holt's wife, Elizabeth. Royle was given the sum of £1000 by William Hunter in his will, on condition that he would continue the Williamsburg printing business for the joint interest of Hunter's infant son William Jr and himself. Royle died before his nephew (William Hunter Jr.) came of age.

Mid life 
Royle was a journeyman who apprenticed under Virginia's "public printer" ("printer to the public") Hunter. He became the foreman in the Williamsburg print shop around 1758 when he was 26 years old. He was foreman in 1759 when it began printing pamphlets, such as the Two Penny Act. Upon the death of Hunter in 1761, Royle took over the position as Virginia's "public printer" – a prestigious job of producing all legal public documents and forms. He continued to be the "public printer" through the Assembly of June 1765. His salary started in 1761 at £350 per year  and increased to £375 in 1764. At the same time, Royle took over Hunter's position as the managing editor of the Virginia Gazette and enlarged it to demy size. He also became the postmaster of the Williamsburg post office, previously Hunter's position. The historian David Hall writes that Royle followed Ben Franklin's example as a typical colonial printer and postmaster.

Royle refused to print the controversial debates happening in the General Assembly of the House of Burgesses during the early 1760s in his Virginia Gazette. He followed closely the philosophies of Francis Fauquier, Lieutenant Governor of colonial Virginia. This compliance to Fauquier's philosophies did not go over well with many of Royle's customers or with their representatives in the House of Burgesses. Royle refused to publish in the Virginia Gazette copies of the 1765 Stamp Act Resolves even when ordered by the House of Burgesses. His refusal to print theses items related to the Stamp Act caused some of the more liberal Virginians to intervene in the situation, deciding that the colony needed a new printer and a more open newspaper. Up until that time, Royle's Virginia Gazette, which was perceived as being a mouthpiece of the colonial authorities, was the only newspaper.

Rev. John Camm sent Royle a pamphlet but could not get his pamphlet published in the Virginia Gazette because Royle objected to its inflammatory "Satyrical Touches upon the Late Assembly." Royle's yearly pay came from the House of Burgesses of Virginia, so he did not want to print anything that would be objectionable to them. He returned Camm's pamphlet giving the reasons why he would not print it. However Royle did print a reply to Camm's pamphlet by House of Burgesses member Richard Bland. Thomas Jefferson and others saw this as a slanted point of view since Royle would not print any attacks on the House of Burgesses, which had inspired a competing outlet – a second "Virginia Gazette" newspaper.

Jefferson pointed out that up to that time there was only one newspaper publication and nothing objectionable to the governor could be put into it that the public could see, and therefore approved another newspaper publisher with apposing viewpoints. Certain Virginians decided at this point to bring in a "patriot" influence to have a more open press, recruiting the printer from Annapolis, William Rind. Rind was co-publisher of the Maryland Gazette and it was hoped that the competing newspaper would be fully independent from Crown interference. While this recruitment of a new printer is often credited to Thomas Jefferson, professor Roger P, Mellen of New Mexico State University shows with a closer examination of newspapers and history of the time that show that it was not Jefferson's doing that brought about an additional printer.

Works 

Printed page samples of Royle's publications:

Some additional publications credited to Royle:
 6 editions of The journal of the House of Burgesses from 1762 into 1765.
 4 editions of Acts of Assembly of General Assembly in the city of Williamsburg of 1762 .
 1 edition each of  To the Honourable Francis Fauquier, His Majesty's lieutenant-governor  of 1761 and 1762.
 4 editions of Anno regni Georgii III of 1762.
 2 editions of Anno regni Georgii III of 1764.
 2 editions of  Critical remarks on a letter ascribed to Common Sense of 1765.

Personal life 

Royle and his wife Roseanna lived with their sons, William and Hunter, at the Ravenscroft property. It is likely that William Hunter Jr., the infant son of William Hunter, lived with them. Royle enslaved at least six people during his time in Virginia; three men, Matt, Aberdeen and George Fisher, and three women. One of the woman was a mulatto named Jenny. Royle may have personally enslaved several more people; the Bruton Parish Church register for births provides names of three people who were born into slavery and lived in Royle's household: 
 Lewis Palace, son of Lydia, baptized September 22, 1762 
 William Paliars, son of Lydia, baptized June 3, 1764
 Joseph, son of Lucy, baptized April 12, 1766.

Several of the people he enslaved ran away, a common occurrence in the Thirteen Colonies. In addition to an advertisement for Jenny, who had run away, Royle placed a notice in the Maryland Gazette  on 2 May 1765 for a £5 reward for the recapture of Fisher, an apprentice bookbinder who also ran away. He was described in the advertisement as "very thick, stoops much, and has a down look; he is a little pock-pitted, has a scar on one of his temples, is much addicted to liquor, very talkative when drunk and remarkably stupid." The amount of £5 for the 25-year-old Fisher was a large sum at the time; he was a skilled journeyman sorely needed in Royle's printing shop.

Royle was the official printer for the colony of Virginia until his death. He died in Williamsburg on January 26, 1766. Alexander Purdie  succeeded him as the printer for Virginia and took over the Williamsburg print shop and publishing the Virginia Gazette. Royle had written in his will that in the event his sons (William and Hunter), the heirs of his estate, proved to be childless, the estate funds should be used to create a children's school to be called "Royle's Free School". He wanted the school to employ a teacher of good standards, who would be paid £50 per year. This teacher should have the capability of teaching English, arithmetic and mathematics.  The school-house was to be built on any part of lots 266 and 267, a section of land inherited by his son William.

See also 

 Early American publishers and printers
 Alexander Purdie (publisher)
 William Hunter (publisher)
 William Parks (publisher)
 Isaac Collins (printer)
 David Hall (publisher)
 Elizabeth Timothy
 Louis Timothee
 Jane Aitken

References

Bibliography 

 
 
 
 
 
 }
 
 

18th-century American newspaper publishers (people)
American male journalists
American slave owners
Virginia colonial people
Colonial Williamsburg
American printers
Virginia postmasters
1732 births
1766 deaths
Burials in Virginia
English emigrants